Little Pond is a community in Prince Edward Island, located in Lot 56 of Kings County.

The community attracted media attention in 2010 when the home of a gay couple living in the community was firebombed. Both men escaped the fire unharmed, but their home was destroyed. The community subsequently held a fundraising rally to support the couple and to express opposition to homophobic violence.

References

Communities in Kings County, Prince Edward Island